Sir William More, 2nd Baronet (1644–1684) was an English politician who sat in the House of Commons  in the second half of the 17th century.

He was the son of Poynings More of Loseley Park. In 1675 he won a by-election at Haslemere, sitting firstly with George Evelyn and then his uncle, James Gresham. He sat again from 1681 to 1685 with George Woodroffe.

Notes

External links
MORE, Sir William, 2nd Bt. (c.1644–84), of Loseley, Surr.

 

Baronets in the Baronetage of England
1644 births
1684 deaths
People from Surrey (before 1889)
English MPs 1661–1679
English MPs 1680–1681